Norse Atlantic UK Ltd is a British airline and integrated subsidiary of Norwegian low-cost airline Norse Atlantic Airways. The airline plans to operate a fleet of Boeing 787 aircraft based at London's Gatwick Airport in May 2023.

History
Following the establishment of parent company Norse Atlantic Airways earlier in 2021, Norse Atlantic UK was founded on 10 May 2021 as a British airline company to operate flights between the United Kingdom and the United States, following Brexit and the subsequent open skies agreement between the two countries. The airline applied for an air operator's certificate (AOC) and operating licence with the United Kingdom Civil Aviation Authority (UK CAA), expecting to receive it during the summer of 2022. Parent company Norse Atlantic Airways also applied for a foreign air carrier permit from the United States Department of Transportation (USDOT) on behalf of its British subsidiary on 22 June 2022, outlining its intention to operate services based at London's Gatwick Airport, initially to Newburgh/New York JFK, Fort Lauderdale, and Orlando airports, with services to Baltimore, Chicago/Rockford, Ontario, and San Francisco airports to follow. The airline subsequently received its AOC and operating licence from the UK CAA on 27 September 2022, and its foreign air carrier permit from the USDOT on 17 October 2022.

On 14 February 2023, parent company Norse Atlantic Airways announced that London Gatwick-based flights operated by the British subsidiary would launch in May 2023, with services to Orlando beginning on 25 May 2023, and Fort Lauderdale on 26 May 2023.

Destinations

Fleet
, the Norse Atlantic UK fleet consists of the following aircraft:

Cabins and services

Identical to that of its parent company, Norse Atlantic UK plans to operate its Boeing 787s with two classes of service, consisting of Premium and Economy classes.

See also
 Norwegian Air UK – Another British subsidiary of a Norwegian company that operated UK-based long-haul commercial flights

References

Airlines of the United Kingdom
Airlines established in 2021
British subsidiaries of foreign companies
2021 establishments in England